The 2018 Washington Open (called the Citi Open for sponsorship reasons) was a tennis tournament played on outdoor hard courts. It was the 50th edition (for the men) and the 8th edition (for the women) of the Washington Open. The event was part of the ATP World Tour 500 series of the 2018 ATP World Tour, and of the WTA International tournaments of the 2018 WTA Tour. It took place at the William H.G. FitzGerald Tennis Center in Washington, D.C., United States, from July 30 to August 5, 2018.

Points and prize money

Point distribution

Prize money 

1 Qualifiers prize money is also the Round of 64 prize money
* per team

ATP singles main-draw entrants

Seeds

1 Rankings are as of July 23, 2018

Other entrants
The following players received wild cards into the main singles draw:
  Daniil Medvedev 
  Tommy Paul
  Noah Rubin
  Tim Smyczek
  Stan Wawrinka

The following player received entry using a protected ranking:
  James Duckworth

The following players received entry from the singles qualifying draw:
  Alex Bolt
  Mitchell Krueger
  Thai-Son Kwiatkowski
  Vincent Millot
  Yosuke Watanuki
  Donald Young

The following player received entry as a lucky loser:
  Jason Kubler

Withdrawals
Before the tournament
  Kevin Anderson → replaced by  Hubert Hurkacz
  Tomáš Berdych → replaced by  Mackenzie McDonald
  Yuki Bhambri → replaced by  James Duckworth
  Alexandr Dolgopolov → replaced by  Ilya Ivashka
  Nick Kyrgios → replaced by  Jason Kubler

During the tournament
  Andy Murray

Retirements
  Vincent Millot

ATP doubles main-draw entrants

Seeds

1 Rankings are as of July 23, 2018

Other entrants
The following pairs received wildcards into the doubles main draw:
  James Cerretani /  Leander Paes
  Denis Kudla /  Frances Tiafoe

The following pair received entry from the doubles qualifying draw:
  Divij Sharan /  Artem Sitak

Withdrawals
Before the tournament
  Nick Kyrgios

During the tournament
  Mischa Zverev

WTA singles main-draw entrants

Seeds

1 Rankings are as of July 23, 2018

Other entrants
The following players received wild cards into the main singles draw:
  Bianca Andreescu
  Bethanie Mattek-Sands
  Katie Swan

The following players received entry as a special exempt:
  Zheng Saisai

The following players received entry from the qualifying draw:
  Harriet Dart
  Anhelina Kalinina
  Allie Kiick
  Sofya Zhuk

The following players received entry as lucky losers:
  Ysaline Bonaventure
  Mayo Hibi

Withdrawals
Before the tournament
  Bianca Andreescu → replaced by  Mayo Hibi
  Zarina Diyas → replaced by  Olivia Rogowska
  Kirsten Flipkens → replaced by  Nao Hibino
  Daria Gavrilova → replaced by  Natalia Vikhlyantseva
  Camila Giorgi → replaced by  Fanny Stollár
  Hsieh Su-wei → replaced by  Han Xinyun
  Monica Niculescu → replaced by  Kristie Ahn
  Anastasija Sevastova → replaced by  Katie Boulter
  Barbora Strýcová → replaced by  Andrea Petkovic
  Lesia Tsurenko → replaced by  Caroline Dolehide
  Caroline Wozniacki → replaced by  Ysaline Bonaventure

During the tournament
  Nao Hibino

WTA doubles main-draw entrants

Seeds

1 Rankings are as of July 23, 2018

Other entrants
The following pair received a wildcard into the doubles main draw:
  Nicole Hammond /  Kristýna Nepivodová
  Alana Smith /  Natasha Subhash

The following pair received entry as alternates:
  Katie Swan /  Rosalie van der Hoek

Withdrawals
Before the tournament
  Galina Voskoboeva
  Zheng Saisai

Champions

Men's singles

  Alexander Zverev def.  Alex de Minaur, 6–2, 6–4

Women's singles

  Svetlana Kuznetsova def.  Donna Vekić, 4–6, 7–6(9–7), 6–2

Men's doubles

  Jamie Murray /  Bruno Soares def.  Mike Bryan /  Édouard Roger-Vasselin, 3–6, 6–3, [10–4]

Women's doubles

  Han Xinyun /  Darija Jurak def.  Alexa Guarachi /  Erin Routliffe, 6–3, 6–2

References

External links
Official website

2018 WTA Tour
2018
2018 in American tennis
2018 in sports in Washington, D.C.
July 2018 sports events in the United States
August 2018 sports events in the United States